The Usquepaug River is a river in the U.S. state of Rhode Island. It flows approximately 12 km (7.5 mi) and is a major tributary of the Pawcatuck River. There are two dams along the river's length.

Course
The river is formed by the confluence of the Queen River and Glen Rock Brook, just above the village of Usquepaug. The river flows into Glen Rock Reservoir, then south through Usquepaug and on to the Pawcatuck River.

Crossings
Below is a list of all crossings over the Usquepaug River. The list starts at the headwaters and goes downstream.
Richmond
Old Usquepaug Road
Kingstown Road
South County Trail (RI 2)

Tributaries
Chickasheen Brook is the Usquepaug River's only named tributaries, though it has many unnamed streams that also feed it.

See also
List of rivers in Rhode Island
Pawcatuck River
Queen River

References
Maps from the United States Geological Survey

Rivers of Washington County, Rhode Island
Rivers of Rhode Island
Tributaries of Pawcatuck River
Wild and Scenic Rivers of the United States